Athirson Mazzoli e Oliveira, (born 16 January 1977), better known as Athirson, is a Brazilian former professional footballer who played as left-back and current coach.

Club career
Athirson was born in Rio de Janeiro and played much of his early career at Flamengo. He was signed by Italian club Juventus in 2001, but was loaned to Flamengo in February 2002. His contract was terminated in October 2003.

Late career
In 2005 Athirson was signed by Bayer Leverkusen, but was released after two years, along with fellow Brazilian defender Roque Junior. He then signed a six months contract with Botafogo. but his contract was terminated on 4 October 2007, after just playing only seven times for the club.

He signed a one-year contract with Brasiliense on 22 February 2008, then signed for Portuguesa in September 2008. On 26 April 2009 the left-back signed for Cruzeiro on a free transfer until December.

He had received an offer from America-RJ after his contract with Portuguesa expired on 31 December 2010. In 2011, he signed for Duque de Caxias to play at Campeonato Brasileiro Série B but was released during the competition. On 6 October 2011, he signed for Projecta, a Brazilian indoor soccer club based at Espírito Santo.

International career
Athirson played five times for the Brazil national team, and was a member of the Brazil squad which finished in second place at the 1999 FIFA Confederations Cup. He also made 14 appearances and scored two goals for the Brazilian U-23 side, which competed at the 2000 Summer Olympics. He was a member of the Brazil under-20 squad which won the 1997 FIFA World Youth Championship.

Style of play
Usually an attacking left back or wing-back, Athirson could also play on the left wing, and as an attacking midfielder. He was useful there because of his accurate passing, long-range striking ability, attacking drive, and articulate dribbling skills. His talent, playing style, nationality, and position led him to be compared to compatriot Roberto Carlos in his youth.

Managerial career
Athirson was appointed coach of Goytacaz in October 2018.

Honours

Club
Flamengo
 Copa de Oro: 1996
 Copa Mercosur: 1999
 Taça Rio: 2000
 Taça Guanabara: 1999, 2004
 Rio de Janeiro State League: 1999, 2000
 Brazilian League: 1999, 2000

Santos
 Brazilian Cup: 1998
 Copa CONMEBOL: 1998
 Torneio Rio – São Paulo: 1999

Juventus
 Serie A: 2001–02

International
Brazil
 Toulon Tournament: 1996
 Gold Cup: 1996
 Copa América: 1999
 Pre-Olympic Tournament: 2000

Individual
 Brazilian Bola de Prata (Placar): 2002

References

External links
 
 
 

Living people
1977 births
Footballers from Rio de Janeiro (city)
Brazilian footballers
Association football defenders
Brazilian football managers
Brazil international footballers
Brazil under-20 international footballers
Olympic footballers of Brazil
Campeonato Brasileiro Série A players
Serie A players
Bundesliga players
1999 FIFA Confederations Cup players
Footballers at the 2000 Summer Olympics
Brazilian people of Italian descent
CR Flamengo footballers
Santos FC players
Cruzeiro Esporte Clube players
Associação Portuguesa de Desportos players
Duque de Caxias Futebol Clube players
Bayer 04 Leverkusen players
Botafogo de Futebol e Regatas players
Juventus F.C. players
America Football Club (RJ) players
São Cristóvão de Futebol e Regatas managers
Esporte Clube Flamengo managers
Goytacaz Futebol Clube managers
Brazilian expatriate footballers
Brazilian expatriate sportspeople in Germany
Expatriate footballers in Germany
Brazilian expatriate sportspeople in Italy
Expatriate footballers in Italy